Catapaecilma major, the common tinsel, is a species of butterfly belonging to the lycaenid family described by Hamilton Herbert Druce in 1895. It is found in the Indomalayan realm.

Description

The larvae feed on Terminalia paniculata.

Subspecies
The subspecies are:
Catapaecilma major major (northern India to Myanmar, northern Thailand)
Catapaecilma major anais Fruhstorfer, 1915 (northeast India)
Catapaecilma major albicans Corbet, 1941 (Myanmar, Thailand, Laos)
Catapaecilma major emas Fruhstorfer, 1912 (Peninsular Malaysia, Singapore, southern Thailand)
Catapaecilma major callone (Fruhstorfer, 1915) (southern India)
Catapaecilma major myosotina Fruhstorfer, 1912 (Sri Lanka)
Catapaecilma major sedina (Fruhstorfer, 1915) (north-eastern Sumatra)
Catapaecilma major moltrechti (Wileman, 1908) (Taiwan)
Catapaecilma major sophonias Fruhstorfer, 1912 (western Java)

References

External links
 Subspecies from Indo-China

Catapaecilma
Butterflies described in 1895